Tenterfield is a regional town in New South Wales, Australia. Tenterfield's proximity to many regional centres and its position on the route between Sydney and Brisbane led to its development as a centre for the promotion of the federation of Australia. The area of Tenterfield was named by German immigrant Sir Tye Cohn, who built Tenterfield station.

Geography 
Tenterfield is located at the northern end of the New England region, at the intersection of the New England and Bruxner Highways. The town is the seat of the Tenterfield Shire. The closest nearby large town is Stanthorpe, Queensland, being 56 km north via the New England Highway. Tenterfield is three hours from Brisbane, Queensland (276 km), three hours from Byron Bay, New South Wales (205 km), two hours from Armidale, New South Wales (188 km) and eight hours from Sydney (663 km). The town is on the north-western stretch of the Northern Tablelands plateau, a spur of the Great Dividing Range, and is nestled in a valley beneath Mount Mackenzie (1,287m elevation), one of the highest points along the Northern Tablelands.

History
Tenterfield's first inhabitants were the Jukembal people who travelled the area from near Glen Innes to Stanthorpe, Queensland.

In 1841, Sir Stuart Donaldson was running 18,000 sheep on a property that he named Tenterfield Station, after a family home, Tenterfield House, in Haddington, Scotland. Donaldson was the first premier of NSW and made biannual trips to Tenterfield to inspect his holdings there, which covered  of unfenced land. Tenterfield Post Office opened on 1 January 1849 and the township was gazetted in 1851 with allotments being sold in 1854. In 1858 gold was discovered at Drake (Fairfield) and shortly afterwards at Timbarra and Boonoo Boonoo. During 1859 an AJS Bank opened and an Anglican church was built the following year. In the 1860s the Tenterfield Chronicle was published, the district court was established; the building of a hospital commenced and a public school was opened. In 1870 the population was less than 900, but the town had five hotels, a school of arts and three churches. The existing Tenterfield Post Office was constructed in 1881.

During World War II, Tenterfield was earmarked as a key battleground if the Japanese should invade Australia. During 1942 thousands of soldiers were set up in emergency camps, unbeknown to the locals, to cope with such an event. Overgrown tank traps and gun emplacements can still be seen on the Travelling Stock Route near the New England Highway. The highway was until the early 1950s the only all-weather road from Sydney to Brisbane.

Heritage listings
Tenterfield  has a number of heritage-listed sites, including:
 Railway Avenue: Tenterfield railway station
 Manners Street: Tenterfield School of Arts
 225 Rouse Street: Tenterfield Post Office

The following buildings and sites are listed on the now defunct Register of the National Estate:. Also includes other buildings and sites as part of Tenterfield's history
 Stannum House, 114 Rouse Street, built c. 1888 by John Holmes Reid - exhibits ex-Buckingham Palace carpets and antique furniture
Ayrdrie, Casino Road, country house built 
 Tenterfield Post Office, built 1881
 Court House, Gaol and Police Buildings, Molesworth Street, 1874–1882
 Church of Our Lady of Perpetual Succour (Tenterfield Catholic Church), 73 Miles Street, oldest building in use in the Catholic Diocese of Armidale
 Tenterfield Saddlery, used as a private residence, bank and saddlery
 Tenterfield School of Arts, 203 Rouse Street, 
 Tooloom Falls Area, south-west of Urbenville
 Woolool Wooloolni/Wellington Rock Aboriginal Site, Basket Swamp National Park
 Aldershot Cottage, built 
 Deloraine Cottage, built 
 124 High Street, built 
 Flanagan's Men's Shop, oldest men's wear shop in Australia.

Railway - Main North Railway Line 
The railway opened to Tenterfield on 28 October 1884 and in 1886 to nearby Wallangarra on the Queensland border, connecting Sydney and Brisbane, with a break-of-gauge at Wallangarra.  When the rail link to the Queensland border was completed, Sydney and Brisbane were linked by rail for the first time. The railway was subsequently bypassed by the fully standard gauge North Coast line between Sydney and Brisbane, completed in 1932. The Main North line is now closed north of Armidale and the Tenterfield railway station is now a museum.

There was considerable debate about whether the break of gauge should take place at the existing town of Tenterfield, or at a whole new town at the border at Wallangarra.

Tenterfield Oration 

Sir Henry Parkes delivered his Federation Speech, commonly referred to as the "Tenterfield Oration", in the Tenterfield School of Arts on 24 October 1889. He was travelling from Brisbane to Sydney, via the new Main North railway. The speech is credited with re-igniting the debate that ultimately led to Federation on 1 January 1901. Parkes never got to see his oration come to fruition, dying 5 years prior to the Federation of Australia.

Population
According to the 2016 census of Population, there were 4,066 people in Tenterfield.
 Aboriginal and Torres Strait Islander people made up 5.0% of the population. 
 80.6% of people were born in Australia and 86.7% of people spoke only English at home. 
 The most common responses for religion were Anglican 24.7%, Catholic 24.3% and No Religion 19.1%.

Industries
The main industries in the Tenterfield district are beef cattle breeding and superfine wool production through the breeding of Merino sheep. There are ten state forests in the Tenterfield district covering .

Media 
The only commercial radio stations serving Tenterfield are Rebel Media stations, Rebel FM 93.7 and The Breeze 102.5.

The Tenterfield-based community radio station is Ten FM.  The station also broadcasts to Stanthorpe north of the border, on a separate frequency.

ABC New England North West and ABC Radio National broadcast to Tenterfield on local FM repeaters.

Tenterfield's local newspaper is The Tenterfield Star, which is a weekly newspaper issued each Wednesday. The newspaper has been published for more than 170 years and was once owned by J. F. Thomas, the solicitor who defended Breaker Morant.

Tenterfield is incorporated into the Lismore television licence area and as such receives regional news bulletins on Prime7 and NBN Television along with brief local news updates on Southern Cross Ten.

Local geography
The local geography is dominated by prominent granite inselbergs and mountains, the most famous being that of Bald Rock, which sits within the Bald Rock National Park, and Bluff Rock which is located 12 minutes drive south of Tenterfield on the New England Highway. Prominent natural landmarks close to Tenterfield are:

 Mount Mackenzie - 1,258m elevation, south-west of CBD, and the highest point in the Tenterfield Shire. Used for television towers and Telstra towers. Features a 141-hectare nature reserve.
 Doctor's Nose - 1,165m elevation - features a 66-hectare nature reserve. Named for resembling the shape of the nose of a local doctor.

Climate

Tenterfield has a subtropical highland climate, with mild winters and warm wet summers with a high diurnal range due to its elevation. Tenterfield averages 47 mornings where the minimum temperature drops below  each year. The town receives light to moderate snowfalls during severe winters. This only occurs once every 20–30 years, although the town experiences occasional sleet. The nearby Mount Mackenzie ( elevation) generally receives light, sometimes moderate, snowfall annually. The town's last snowfall occurred during the winter of 2015, although, the most recent snowfall close to Tenterfield was on 4 June 2019, when a low pressure system swept north through NSW. This caused it to snow on Mount Mackenzie and other points above  throughout the New England region. Summers are moderately warm to hot, with most days during the summer months reaching  or above, and not dropping below  overnight. The majority of precipitation occurs as thunderstorms, which can be severe.

Mount Mackenzie Road Fire 

On 6 September 2019 a grass fire started near Mount Mackenzie Road to the south west of Tenterfield, The fire was aided by dry winds and unseasonable heat due to a weather front that was sweeping across New South Wales. Within an hour the fire was upgraded to an emergency level threat and it swept across the southern edge of the town. All schools in Tenterfield were evacuated and power was cut to the town. 65 homes in the immediate area of the fire were saved. one home was destroyed and 4 other homes damaged severely. 2 car yards, a pistol club and 12 outbuildings were destroyed and another 8 outbuildings damaged A 66 year old Tenterfield man, Neville Smith, a volunteer NSW firefighter was severely injured when the fire truck he was in was engulfed by flames while defending a property, he was stabilised at Tenterfield Hospital then airlifted to Brisbane in a stable but critical condition.

The fire continued to burn with an emergency warning throughout the night and was later downgraded by the New South Wales Rural Fire Service to a 'watch and act' level on 7 September as conditions on the fire grounds were easing due to cooler weather and large teams of firefighters with multiple aircraft assisting them with the fire.

Notable residents

 Peter Allen, an entertainer who was born in and spent much of his childhood in Tenterfield, where he lived with his grandfather George Woolnough
 Bronwyn Bancroft, an indigenous Australian artist
 William Blakely, born in Tenterfield in 1875, a botanist and plant collector
 Sir Harry Chauvel, born at nearby Tabulam, the first Australian to command a military Corps
 William Folster, politician
 Robert Guy Howarth, born in Tenterfield in 1906, scholar, literary critic and poet
 Katherine Knight (born 1955), murderer who skinned her partner and cooked his body parts
 Sir Clarence McKerihan, banker and president of the Rural Bank of New South Wales.
 Billy Moore, NRL footballer
 A.B. "Banjo" Paterson
 Jenny Saville, professional golfer
 Gary Shearston (1939–2013), singer and songwriter.
 Dr. Leonard Smith, Aboriginal Artist, Writer, Professional Rugby League Player，Australian Army Veteran and Philanthropist. Attended Tenterfield High in 1959
 Charlie Tapscott, 2 x paralympian silver medalist
 Major J.F. Thomas, a solicitor known for his vigorous defence of Harry "Breaker" Morant, and once owned and operated the Tenterfield Star newspaper. Jack Thompson portrayed Thomas in the 1980 film Breaker Morant
 Edward Reeves Whereat (1840-1894) an early community leader
 George Woolnough, Allen's grandfather, a saddler, the third person to own the saddlery and the subject of Allen's song "Tenterfield Saddler"
 Oliver Woodward, decorated First World War veteran and metallurgist

Sporting records
 The first campdraft ever held (to rules) was held in Tenterfield in c.1885.
 The Australian showjumping record was broken at Tenterfield in 1926 Mrs A. A. Laidlaw's "Lookout", ridden by A. McPhee jumped 7’10¼".
 The world showjumping record was broken at Tenterfield in 1936 by C. H. Perry's "Lookout", ridden by W Marton when he jumped 8’3½".
 Guinness World Record achieved by then local Police Sergeant Troy Grant at the Tenterfield Golf Club in 2004 for the most holes of golf completed in 7 days.

See also

High Conservation Value Old Growth forest
Federation of Australia
Sir Henry Parkes
Tenterfield Saddler

References

Further reading

External links

 Local government site
 Tenterfield Business & Tourism Gateway
 Tenterfield Accommodation Directory
 Tenterfield Attractions

 
Towns in New South Wales
Towns in New England (New South Wales)
1851 establishments in Australia
Tenterfield Shire